Hubert Tonka (born 1943) is a French sociologist and urban planner who edited the Utopie magazine, and was one of the leaders of the Utopie movement in the late 1960s and early 1970s.

Career

For family reasons, Tonka had to start work at a very young age.  In Paris around 1960 he was taking night classes for a diploma in urban planning while working in the day, where he met other members of what would become the Utopie group.
He worked as a plasterer in the day.
He became the assistant of Henri Lefebvre, who was a professor at the University of Paris's institute of urban planning.
He was an aesthete, and a refined typographer.
By the end of 1966 he was a member of the editorial committee of Melp!, the École Nationale Supérieure des Beaux-Arts student association's review, along with Jacques Barda, Roland Castro, Pierre Granveaud and Antoine Grumbach.
Melp! helped to articulate the dissatisfaction of students in the lead-up to the protests of 1968.
Tonka was co-founder of the Vincennes department of urbanism.

The Utopie group originated from a meeting at Lefebvre's house in 1966.
It included the architects Jean Aubert, Jean-Paul Jungmann and Antoine Stinco, the landscape architect Isabelle Auricoste (his wife) and the sociologists Jean Baudrillard, René Lourau and Catherine Cot.
Utopie, review de sociologie de l'urbain first appeared in May 1967, with Tonka as managing editor.
Tonka created L'Imprimerie Quotidienne, which printed the magazine.
Tonka edited and promoted collections of Baudrillard's essays, helping to draw the attention of the public to his views, which were at first Marxist but later moved towards the center.

Tonka became a Director at the French Institute of Architecture (1987) and a Professor of architecture and contemporary art in Bordeaux and Angers (1994).
In the 1990s Tonka and singer, songwriter and author Jeanne-Marie Sens founded the publishing house Sens & Tonka.
Tonka and Sens co-authored and published several books on architecture.

Views

Tonka gave life to the Pneumatic concepts of the Utopie group, which advocated ephemeral, inflatable structures.
Tonka held extreme left opinions, close to the anarchists, that could be traced back to Rosa Luxemburg and Mikhail Bakunin.
Talking of the intellectual roots of the Utopie group, Tonka said:

In a 1971 interview Tonka said "To imagine ... that it is possible to act politically through urbanism, architecture, and the detournement of either is a dream."  
He believed that only a revolution could change society, and this could only happen in spite of architecture, which is by definition repressive.

Selected bibliography

References
Citations

Sources

French sociologists
Living people
1943 births
French urban planners
French male writers